Henry Eckhard Grampp (September 28, 1903 -  March 24, 1986) was a pitcher in Major League Baseball. He played for the Chicago Cubs in 1927 and 1929.

References

External links

1903 births
1986 deaths
Major League Baseball pitchers
Chicago Cubs players
Baseball players from New York (state)